Lleyton Hewitt was the defending champion, but lost in the second round to Julien Benneteau.

Unseeded Sam Querrey won in the final 4–6, 6–3, 6–4, against qualifier Kevin Anderson.

Seeds

Draw

Finals

Top half

Bottom half

External links
Association of Tennis Professionals (ATP) singles draw
Association of Tennis Professionals (ATP) qualifying draw

Singles